Angeline Chua Kai Yi (born 7 November 1988), known as Angeline Chua, is a Singaporean former footballer who plays as a midfielder for the Singapore women's national team. Chua is Seychelles Football Federation's director of women's football and head coach of Seychelles women's senior national team.

Coaching career 
Chua started coaching when she was a polytechnic student, coaching Arion Football Academy's U-4 to U-8 age groups.

Chua subsequently became the assistant coach of the Singapore women's football team's U-14 and U-16 teams. She would later become the national Under-14 women's head coach.

In April 2021, Chua took up a two year contract to become Seychelles Football Federation's director of women's football and head coach of Seychelles women's senior national team.

International goals
Scores and results list Singapore's goal tally first.

References

1988 births
Living people
Singaporean women's footballers
Women's association football midfielders
Singapore women's international footballers
Singaporean sportspeople of Chinese descent